Tony Archer may refer to:

 Tony Archer (musician) (born 1938), English jazz double-bassist
 Tony Archer (referee) (born 1969), rugby league referee
 Tony Archer (Archers), fictional character in The Archers
 fictional NYPD bomb expert in Hawaii Five-0